Crow Head is a small town located on the north island of Twillingate in Newfoundland and Labrador, Canada. It is home to the Long Point Lighthouse and Twillingate Dinner Theatre. Its only land border is with the Town of Twillingate, to the southeast.

As of 2021, there were 156 residents, down from 203 in 2011.

Its mayor, John Hamlyn, has been serving since 1963 and is the longest-serving mayor in Canada.

Demographics 

See also 
Little Harbour, Newfoundland and Labrador
Purcell's Harbour
Durrell, Newfoundland and Labrador
Back Harbour

References

External links
 
Crow Head - Encyclopedia of Newfoundland and Labrador, vol. 1, p. 564.

Populated coastal places in Canada
Towns in Newfoundland and Labrador